AlphaSim was a flight-simulation addon developer, based in the Bay of Plenty, New Zealand. The company was well known throughout the flight simulation community for their numerous highly detailed & realistic military simulation products. They developed both aircraft and scenery for the Microsoft Flight Simulator series. AlphaSim was renowned for developing often-niche aircraft as well as mainstream interests.  On August 18, 2010, AlphaSim announced, "[We have] ceased trading.  Due to circumstances beyond our control, this site will no longer be selling FS addons."

The website has since been shut down, and many workers from the AlphaSim team have opened a new company called Virtavia. Virtavia sells FSX addons through their own site, and third party vender sites such as Flight1.com.

The AlphaSim logo has evolved over the years.  The final design was an aircraft creating an Alpha symbol with a smoke trail; logo was created in 2005.

Example noteworthy products
Hawker Hunter
MH-53 Pave Low
AH-64A Apache
T-6 Texan
Admiral Kuznetsov
RAF Leuchars
Lockheed SR-71 Blackbird
Lockheed C-130 Hercules
Republic F-105 Thunderchief
Consolidated B-24 Liberator
English Electric Lightning
Panavia Tornado
Convair F-106 Delta Dart
English Electric Canberra
A-6E Intruder/EA-6B Prowler
B-1 Lancer
Bristol Blenheim
Heinkel He 111
Mikoyan-Gurevich MiG-25
B-47 Stratojet

References

External links
Official site
Virtavia

Defunct video game companies of New Zealand
Video game development companies